Jean Hall Lloyd-Jones (born October 14, 1929) is an American activist and politician.

Born in Washington, D.C., Lloyd-Jones went to the University of New Mexico. She received her bachelor's degree from Northwestern University and her master's degree from University of Iowa. She was involved with the Iowa Peace Institute and the Iowa League of Women Voters. Lloyd-Jones served as a Democrat, from Iowa City, Iowa, in the Iowa House of Representatives from 1979 to 1987 and then in the Iowa Senate from 1987 to 1995.

Lloyd-Jones ran for U.S. Senate in 1992 during the "Year of the Woman," but lost to incumbent Chuck Grassley.

Notes

1929 births
Democratic Party Iowa state senators
Living people
Democratic Party members of the Iowa House of Representatives
Northwestern University alumni
Politicians from Washington, D.C.
Politicians from Iowa City, Iowa
University of Iowa alumni
University of New Mexico alumni
Women state legislators in Iowa
21st-century American women